The Porto Cathedral is a Roman Catholic church located in the historical centre of the city of Porto, Portugal. It is one of the city's oldest monuments and one of the most important local Romanesque monuments.

Overview 

Unlike what's often written, the current Cathedral of Porto was not built under the patronage of Bishop Hugo since the pre-Romanesque church is still mentioned in the De Expugnatione Lyxbonensi as still extant in 1147. This means the present building was only started in the second half of the century and it would be constantly under works well until the 16th century (without counting later Baroque and 20th century interventions), but there is evidence that the city has been a bishopric seat since the Suevi domination in the 5th-6th centuries.

The cathedral is flanked by two square towers, each supported with two buttresses and crowned with a cupola. The façade lacks decoration and is rather architecturally heterogeneous. It shows  a Baroque porch and a beautiful Romanesque rose window under a crenellated arch, giving the impression of a fortified church.

The  Romanesque nave is rather narrow and is covered by barrel vaulting. It is flanked by two aisles with a lower vault. The stone roof of the central aisle is supported by flying buttresses, making the building one of the first in Portugal to use this architectonic feature.

This first Romanesque building has suffered many alterations but the general aspect of the façade has remained romanesque.

Around 1333 the Gothic funerary chapel of João Gordo was added.  João was a Knight Hospitaller who worked for King Dinis I. His tomb is decorated with his recumbent figure and reliefs of the Apostles. Also from the Gothic period is the elegant cloister, built between the 14th and the 15th centuries during the reign of King John I, who married English Princess Philippa of Lancaster in Porto Cathedral in 1387.

The external appearance of the cathedral was greatly altered during Baroque times. In 1772 a new main portal substituted the old Romanesque original and the tower cupolas were altered. In 1736 Italian architect Nicolau Nasoni added an elegant Baroque loggia to the lateral façade of the cathedral. During the War of the Oranges whilst the battle at Amarante was taking place a group of Spanish soldiers briefly took control of the cathedral before being overcome by the locals of the town. A marble plaque with a Magnetite backing now hangs up behind the altar in order to remind everyone of those who died whilst regaining control of the chapel. The magnetite backing was chosen in order to remind those travelling near the cathedral by interfering with the direction in which their compass points,

The interior was also altered during the baroque era. In one of the chapels there is a magnificent silver altarpiece, built in the second half of the 17th century by Portuguese artists. Also in the 17th century the romanesque apse (which had an ambulatory) was torn down and a new one was built in baroque style, later decorated with new wall paintings by Nasoni and choir stalls. The altarpiece of the chapel, designed by Santos Pacheco and executed by Miguel Francisco da Silva between 1727 and 1729, is an important work of Portuguese Baroque.

The three red marble holy-water fonts, supported by a statue, date from the 17th century. The baptistery contains a bronze bas-relief by António Teixeira Lopes, depicting the baptism of Christ by John the Baptist.

The South transept arm gives access to the Gothic cloister, which is decorated with baroque azulejos by Valentim de Almeida (between 1729 and 1731). They depict the life of the Virgin Mary and Ovid's Metamorphoses. The remains of the Early-Romanesque ambulatory contain a few sarcophagi. The terrace is decorated with tile panels by António Vidal. The coffered ceiling of the chapter house was painted with allegories of moral values by Pachini in 1737.

Mass is celebrated at 11am each day.

See also 
 Lisbon Cathedral
 Silves Cathedral
 Viseu Cathedral

References

Sources

Portugal/1 - Europa Romanica, Gerhard N Graf, Ediciones Encuentro, Madrid, 1987
General Bureau for National Buildings and Monuments (Portugal)

Roman Catholic churches completed in 1737
Roman Catholic churches in Porto
Roman Catholic cathedrals in Portugal
Romanesque architecture in Portugal
Gothic architecture in Portugal
Baroque church buildings in Portugal
History of Porto
Azulejos in buildings in Portugal
National monuments in Porto District
18th-century Roman Catholic church buildings in Portugal